Ray Arnott is an Australian rock drummer, singer-songwriter, he was a member of Spectrum (1970–1973), which had a number one hit with "I'll Be Gone" . He also  played drums for The Dingoes in the 1970s and Cold Chisel in 1980s.

Biography

Ray grew up in Brisbane and played with Glenn Weatley of Masters of Apprentices fame In the Vacant Lot also with Chelsea Set whose claim to fame was supporting the Easybeats. Ray moved to Melbourne with the Chelsea Set in 1966. Ray left the band to join the Browns, who were the backing band for Vergil Brothers, Johnny Farnham, Colleen Hewitt, Wendy Saddington, and Oliva Newtown John. Ray did a stint with Matt Taylor in the band Genesis and Gulliver Smith in Company Caine. In late 1970 he replaced original drummer Mark Kennedy in the renowned Australian progressive rock group Spectrum and he remained with them until they split in early 1973. He sang backing and lead vocals with the band, as well as drumming, and he contributed several songs to their repertoire.

Arnott left Spectrum to join Mighty Kong, a new band formed by ex-Daddy Cool members Ross Wilson and Ross Hannaford, but the new group was very short-lived and broke up soon after recording its only LP in late 1973. Ray then recorded with Rick Springfield and Phil Ochs and was produced by John Fishbach, who had worked with Stevie Wonder.

Arnott took over the drum stool from the original drummer in two of the most prominent Australian groups of the period, The Dingoes in the mid 1970s and Cold Chisel in 1983 and recorded the Twentieth Century album with the band and toured extensively.

During the late '70s to mid '80s, Arnott served as the drummer for George Young (brother of Angus and Malcolm Young of AC/DC) and Harry Vanda doing many projects including Cheetah, John Paul Young, Choirboys, and Flash and the Pan. Ray also recorded two solo album for Alberts with Angus Young playing lead on Rock N Roll Gal from the album Rude Dudes, which also featured Jimmy Banes, Ross Wilson, Pete Wells, Ace Follington, Warren Pig Morgan, Ronnie Peel, Harry Vanda, and Graham Parker's horn section.

Cold Chisel frontman Jimmy Barnes took on Arnott for his first two solo releases, the Bodyswerve album in 1984 and For the Working Class Man album in 1985. Ray toured extensively with Jimmy Barnes and co-wrote one song for the Bodyswerve album. 

Stephen Still recorded one of Ray's songs Flaming Heart for his album Right By You in 1984 after Jimmy Page heard the song and recommended it to Stills.

Ray now lives in the Northern Rivers of NSW and works as a youth counsellor and music therapist, and still continues his songwriting and also plays locally. In July 2015 Ray was interviewed by The Australian Rock Show. Ray has several exciting new projects coming out in 2023.

References

General
  Note: Archived [on-line] copy has limited functionality.
  Note: [on-line] version established at White Room Electronic Publishing Pty Ltd in 2007 and was expanded from the 2002 edition.

Specific

Australian rock drummers
Male drummers
Year of birth missing (living people)
Living people
Cold Chisel members
Spectrum (band) members